Bahram (also Romanized as Bahrām; also known as Cheshmeh Kūreh) is a village in Kashkan Rural District, Shahivand District, Dowreh County, Lorestan Province, Iran. At the 2006 census, its population was 60, in 15 families.

References 

Towns and villages in Dowreh County